Vladimir "Vlado" Šola (born 16 November 1968) is a Croatian handball coach and former player. 

Born in Prisoje, Šola played the position of goalkeeper on the Croatian national team and competed in the 2004 Summer Olympics. Widely known for his energetic attitude and famously dyed red hair, he retired from playing professional handball in 2008.

Honours

Club
Medveščak
Yugoslav Cup:  1986, 1987, 1989, 1990
Limburgse Handbal Dagen: 1993

Veszprem
Hungarian First League: 2004–05, 2005–06
Hungarian Cup: 2005

RK Zagreb
Croatian Premier League: 2006–07, 2007–08
Croatian Cup: 2007, 2008

Individual
Franjo Bučar State Award for Sport - 2004

Orders
 Order of Danica Hrvatska with face of Franjo Bučar – 1995
 Order of Duke Trpimir with Neck Badge and Morning Star – 2004

References

External links
 Croatia tops Germany for handball title
 
 
 
 

1968 births
Living people
Croatian male handball players
Olympic handball players of Croatia
Handball players at the 2004 Summer Olympics
Olympic gold medalists for Croatia
Croats of Bosnia and Herzegovina
People from Tomislavgrad
RK Zagreb players
Olympic medalists in handball
Medalists at the 2004 Summer Olympics
Mediterranean Games gold medalists for Croatia
Competitors at the 1993 Mediterranean Games
Mediterranean Games medalists in handball